Bhawanipur Hastinapur Bijni College is an undergraduate college established in the year 1971 at Sarupeta of Barpeta district in Assam. The college is affiliated to Gauhati University.

Departments
Assamese
English
Economics
Sanskrit
History	
Mathematics
Philosophy	 	 
Political science
Arabic
Statistics
Bodo
Commerce
Computer application

Accreditation
In 2016 the college has been awarded "B++" grade with CGPA 2.78 by National Assessment and Accreditation Council. The college is also recognised by University Grants Commission (India).

References

External links

Colleges affiliated to Gauhati University
Universities and colleges in Assam
1971 establishments in Assam
Educational institutions established in 1971